Rassundari Devi (c. 1809-1899) was a Bengali woman who is identified as the author of first full-fledged autobiography in modern Bengali literature. She is among the earliest woman writers in Bengali literature.

Rashsundari Devi was born in Eastern Bengal and was the first Indian woman to write an autobiography and the first Bengali to write an autobiography. Aamar Jiban (My Life), her autobiography, was published in 1876.

Biography 
Rashsundari Devi was born c. 1809 in the village of Potajia, in Pabna district. Her father, Padmalochan Roy, died when Rasssundari was a small child. She never saw her father and was raised by her mother and relatives. Formal education was not given to girls of the time. She used to be around a boys' school run by a missionary woman in her father's house. By listening to the lessons going on at school Rashsundari learned the letters of the Bengali language.

At age 12 she married Sitanath Sarkar from Ramdia village, Rajbari, Faridpur. She was a religious Vaishnavite by faith. With limited formal schooling, she learned to read driven by Bhakti (devotion), out of her keen desire to read Valmiki Purana and Chaitanya Bhagavata. She learned how to read and write in the flickering light of candles at night. She bore 12 children, of whom 7 died early. Her husband died in 1868. Her son Kishori Lal Sarkar became an advocate at Calcutta High Court and is the author of several noteworthy works. Rassundari died in 1899..

Writings

In 1876 Rassundari's autobiography Amar Jiban (My Life) was published. The book is in two parts,  the first of which, consisting of sixteen shorter compositions narrated her autobiography. The second part, published in 1906, contained fifteen shorter compositions, each preceded by a dedicatory poem.

Jyotirindranath Tagore praised the book for the 'wonderful train of events' and its 'simple sweetness' of expression. Dinesh Chandra Sen called her prose an 'epitome of simple prose compositions of the bygone era'. Her book was translated into Hindi as Mera Jeevan.

References 

1809 births
1899 deaths
19th-century Indian biographers
19th-century Indian women writers
19th-century Indian non-fiction writers
Bengali writers
Bengali-language writers
Indian autobiographers
People from Pabna District
Women writers from West Bengal